The 2003 Harlow District Council election took place on 1 May 2003 to elect members of Harlow District Council in Essex, England. One third of the council was up for election and the council stayed under no overall control.

After the election, the composition of the council was
Conservative 12
Liberal Democrats 12
Labour 9

Background
Before the election both the Conservatives and Liberal Democrats had 12 councillors, while Labour had 9 seats.

A total of 36 candidates stood for the 11 seats that were being contested, with the councillors who got the lowest number of votes from the 2002 election defending their seats. One Labour councillor, John Cave, stood down at the election after 32 years, while 3 former Labour councillors and 1 former Liberal Democrat councillor attempted to regain seats. Among the councillors defending their seats was the Conservative group leader Andrew Johnson in Sumners and Kingsmoor ward.

Election result
There was no change in the party situation on the council with no party gaining a majority. The closest result was in Bush Fair ward where Liberal Democrat Chris Millington held the seat by 39 votes, but the Liberal Democrat council chairman Nick Macy was not re-elected after contesting the Labour held seat in Little Parndon and Hare Street. Overall turnout at the election was 29%.

However an enquiry was started after the election as 3,279 postal votes had to be rejected as they did not have an official mark on them.

Ward results

Bush Fair

Church Langley

Great Parndon

Harlow Common

Little Parndon & Hare Street

Mark Hall

Netteswell

Old Harlow

Staple Tye

Sumners and Kingsmoor

Toddbrook

References

2003
2003 English local elections
2000s in Essex